Glentoran Women is a women's football club from Belfast, Northern Ireland.

The team has won the Women's Premiership of Northern Ireland nine times, most recently in 2021 and are the country's record champions.

European record
In UEFA competitions Glentoran went without a win in their first three attempts. In the 2009–10 Champions League qualifying round they won their first game 2–0 against Roma Calfa but failed to qualify from their group.

UEFA Women's Cup:
 2005–06: 1st qualifying round 4th
 2007–08: 1st qualifying round 4th
 2008–09: 1st qualifying round 4th

UEFA Women's Champions League:
 2009–10: qualifying round 3rd
 2012–13: qualifying round 3rd
 2014–15: qualifying round 3rd
 2015–16: qualifying round 3rd

Titles
 Women's Premiership 
Winners (9): 2004, 2006, 2007, 2008, 2011, 2013, 2014, 2020, 2021
 IFA Women's Challenge Cup 
Winners (8): 2006, 2007, 2008, 2009, 2010, 2012, 2018, 2019, 2022

Current squad

As of 3 April 2022,

References

External links

Women's association football clubs in Northern Ireland
1987 establishments in Northern Ireland
Glentoran F.C.
Association football clubs in Belfast
Women's Premiership (Northern Ireland) teams